DNA-directed RNA polymerases I, II, and III subunit RPABC3 is a protein that in humans is encoded by the POLR2H gene.

This gene encodes one of the essential subunits of RNA polymerase II that is shared by the other two eukaryotic DNA-directed RNA polymerases, I and III.

Interactions
POLR2H has been shown to interact with POLR2C, POLR2G, POLR2A, POLR2B and POLR2E.

References

Further reading